Pure may refer to:

Computing
 A pure function
 A pure virtual function
 PureSystems, a family of computer systems introduced by IBM in 2012
 Pure Software, a company founded in 1991 by Reed Hastings to support the Purify tool
 Pure-FTPd, FTP server software
 Pure (programming language), functional programming language based on term rewriting
 Pure Storage, a company that makes datacenter storage solutions
 Pure (CRIS), a research information system bought by Elsevier.

Companies and products
 Pure (app), dating app
 Pure (restaurant chain), a British fast food chain
 Pure Insurance, Privilege Underwriters Reciprocal Exchange
 Pure Trading, a Canadian electronic communication network operated by CNQ
 Pure Digital, a UK consumer electronics company specialising in DAB radios
 Pure Oil, a U.S. chain of gas stations
 Propulsion Universelle et Récuperation d'Énergie (PURE), a motorsport engineering company
 Pure FM (Portsmouth), a university radio station based in Portsmouth, UK
 Pure (Belgian radio station), a former Belgian radio station

Literature 
 Pure (magazine), a magazine created by Peter Sotos
 Pure (Miller novel), a 2011 novel by Andrew Miller
 Pure (Baggott novel), a 2012 novel by Julianna Baggott
 PURE, 2016 play about chocolate manufacture, commissioned by Mikron Theatre Company

Video games 
 Pure (video game), an off-road racing video game for Microsoft Windows, Xbox 360 and PlayStation 3

Establishments 
 Pure Nightclub, a nightclub in Las Vegas, Nevada

Music 
 Pure (Canadian band), a Canadian rock band till 2000

Albums
 Pure (3 Colours Red album), 1997
 Pure (Godflesh album), 1992
 Pure (Gary Numan album), 2000
 Pure (Hayley Westenra album), 2003
 Pure (No Angels album), 2003
 Pure (The Lightning Seeds album), 1996
 Pure (Maksim Mrvica album), 2007
 Pure II (Maksim Mrvica album), 2008
 Pure (The Primitives album), 1989
 Pure (The Jesus Lizard album), 1989
 Pure (Lara Fabian album), 1997
 Pure (Pendragon album)
 Pure (Boney James album), 2004
 Pure (Chris Potter album), 1994

Songs
 "Pure" (Orgy song), 2005
 "Pure" (Dream song)
 "Pure" (The Lightning Seeds song), 1989
 "Pure", a song by Endless Shame
 "Pure", a song and single by 3 Colours Red from Pure 1997
 "Pure", a song by Paris Angels B-side to "Perfume (Loved Up)" 1991

Film and television 
 Pure (2002 film), a 2002 British film
 Pure (2005 film), a 2005 Canadian film
 Pure (2010 film), a 2010 Swedish film
 Pure (Canadian TV series), a 2017 Canadian TV series
 Pure (British TV series), a 2019 UK TV series
 "Pure" (Law & Order: Special Victims Unit), an episode of Law & Order: Special Victims Unit
 "Pure" (Into the Dark), an episode of the first season of Into the Dark

Places
 Pure, Ardennes

See also 
 Cleanliness
 Impurity (disambiguation)
 Pure land
 PureGym, a chain of health clubs in the United Kingdom
 Puritans
 Purity (disambiguation)
 Unclean (disambiguation)